Oakland Mills may refer to:

Oakland Mills, Columbia, Maryland
Oakland Mills High School
Oakland Mills Blacksmith House and Shop
Oakland Mills, New Jersey